Iain Ferguson  is a British businessman. He is the current chairman of Wilton Park, Berendsen and Stobart Group.

Career
Following graduation from the University of St Andrews with a BSc in chemistry and psychology, he was with Unilever for 26 years. Ferguson has been president of the Food and Drink Federation and was CEO of Tate & Lyle plc from May 2003 until October 2009.

He is the current chairman of Wilton Park, Berendsen plc and Stobart Group Ltd. He was a non-executive director at Greggs plc. He is also the honorary vice president of the British Nutrition Foundation (BNF) and is the lead non-executive board member for the UK government's Department for Environment, Food and Rural Affairs (DEFRA).

Personal life
His wife and daughter are also graduates of St Andrews.

Honours

In the Queen's 2003 Birthday Honours List, Ferguson was appointed a CBE for services to the food industry.

References

Living people
British chief executives
Commanders of the Order of the British Empire
Alumni of the University of St Andrews
Tate & Lyle people
Year of birth missing (living people)